Rosetti may refer to:

 Rosetti (company), a fashion brand, producing handbags and accessories
 Rosette (cookie), a Finnish dessert
 Rosetti family
 Piața Rosetti, a small square in Bucharest, Romania

People with the surname
 Alexandru Rosetti, Romanian linguist
 Antonio Rosetti (c. 1750–1792), a classical era composer
 Constantin Rosetti (C. A. Rosetti; 1816–1885), Romanian literary and political leader, of noble Byzantine descent
 Lascaris Rosetti (1580–1646), high chancellor of the Patriarchate of Constantinople; 
 Bella Rosetti (1534–1594, died 17th century), wife of Lascaris Rosetti; 
 Constantin Rosetti (1600–1688), son of Bella and Lascaris Rosetti; 
 Antonie Rosetti (c. 1615–1685), son of Bella and Lascaris Rosetti
 Gino Rossetti (former name Rosetti, 1904–1992), Italian football player
 Maria Rosetti (1819–1893), an English-born Wallachian and Romanian political activist
 Maria Tescanu Rosetti (1879–1968), Romanian aristocrat and lady-in-waiting 
 Nicolae Rosetti-Bălănescu (1827–1884), lawyer and Romanian politician
 Radu D. Rosetti (1874–1964), Romanian author and lawyer
 Radu R. Rosetti (1877–1949), Romanian general and historian
 Roberto Rosetti (born 1967), Italian football referee
 Theodor Rosetti (1837–1932), Romanian writer, journalist and politician who served as Prime Minister of Romania

See also
 C. A. Rosetti (disambiguation)
 Rossetti (disambiguation)
 Roseți
 Rosseti
 Rosette (disambiguation)
 

Romanian-language surnames
Romanian families
Italian-language surnames